Ergolea is a genus of moths in the family Lasiocampidae first described by Constantin Dumont in 1922.

Species
Based on Lepidoptera and Some Other Life Forms:
Ergolea reneae Dumont, 1922 found in Algeria
Ergolea geyri (Rothschild, 1916)

External links

Lasiocampidae